L'Hôpital-le-Grand is a commune in the Loire department in central France.

Geography 
L'Hôpital-le-Grand is situated near Boisset-lès-Montrond, Craintilleux, Sury-le-Comtal, and Montbrison.

Population

See also
Communes of the Loire department

References

Communes of Loire (department)